Imran Shah (born 25 September 1988) is a field hockey player from Pakistan. He plays as a goal keeper.

Career

2010
Shah took part in the 2010 Commonwealth Games in New Delhi, India.

2012
Shah is part of the squad at the 2012 Olympic Games in London, UK.

See also
Pakistan national field hockey team

References

Pakistani male field hockey players
Field hockey players at the 2010 Commonwealth Games
Living people
1988 births
Olympic field hockey players of Pakistan
Field hockey players at the 2012 Summer Olympics
Commonwealth Games competitors for Pakistan
21st-century Pakistani people